Nachtmystium is an EP by Nachtmystium.

Regimental Records: CD limited to 1000 copies.
Painiac Records: vinyl version limited to handnumbered 400 copies.
Battle Kommand Records re-release done in November 2005, with new artwork.
Reissued with 'Reign of the Malicious' on CD by Desire of Goat Productions in 2005, limited to 500 copies.

Track listing
 The Glorious Moment - 05:12	
 Cold Tormentor (I've Become) - 02:44	
 Come Forth, Devastation - 03:22	
 Embrace Red Horizon - 02:31	
 Call of the Ancient - 04:24	
 Gaze Upon Heaven in Flames (Judas Iscariot cover) - 05:47

Production
Recorded in August 2002 at Bride of Insect Studios, Chicago, IL, except 'Gaze Upon Heaven in Flames' which was recorded at Hellgod Studios mid-2002
Engineered by D.o.A.

Personnel
Azentrius: Guitars, bass and vocals
Zmij: Vocals
Aamonael: Guitars
Session member: Drums

Additional personnel
 Christophe Szpajdel — logo

External links
 Nachtmystium Website
 Nachtmystium on Encyclopaedia Metallum

Nachtmystium albums
2003 albums